Naea Tommy Irving Bennett (born 8 July 1977) is a French Polynesian footballer, politician, and Cabinet Minister. He plays as a striker for AS Pirae and also represents the Tahiti national beach soccer team. He is son of Erroll Bennett, a former Tahitian footballer who was runner-up at 1973 and 1980 OFC Nations Cup.

Football career
In 2002, Naea Bennett took part in 4 qualifying matches for the World Cup with the Tahiti team. While playing for AS Pirae, Bennett joined the Tahiti beach soccer team, and competed in both the 2011 and 2015 World Cups. In all he took part in 8 matches for as many wins as losses and 5 goals scored. In October 2013 he was appointed a knight of the Order of Tahiti Nui.

Bennett is a Mormon and refuses to play football on Sundays. In 2015, he refused to play in the 2015 FIFA Beach Soccer World Cup final due to his religious beliefs.

In 2018 he was appointed interim head coach of the Tahiti national football team.

Political career
In February 2022 he was appointed to the cabinet of Édouard Fritch as Minister of Youth, Crime Prevention and Sports.

International goals

References

External links

1977 births
Living people
French Polynesian footballers
Tahitian beach soccer players
Tahiti international footballers
Association football forwards
A.S. Pirae players
French Polynesian Latter Day Saints
Tahiti national football team managers
1996 OFC Nations Cup players
2000 OFC Nations Cup players
2002 OFC Nations Cup players
Recipients of the Order of Tahiti Nui
Government ministers of French Polynesia